Meu Bem Querer (My Wishing Well) is a Brazilian telenovela produced and aired by TV Globo. Written by Ricardo Linhares, with the collaboration of Leonor Bassères, Nelson Nadotti, Maria Elisa Berredo and Glória Barretoentre, monitoring text by Aguinaldo Silva, direction of Luís Henrique Rios, João Camargo and Alexandre Avancini, direction general of Roberto Naar and nucleus of Marcos Paulo and transmitted by August 24, 1998 and January 20, 1999, totaling 179 episodes.

Cast

References

External links

1998 Brazilian television series debuts
1999 Brazilian television series endings
1998 telenovelas
TV Globo telenovelas
Brazilian telenovelas
Portuguese-language telenovelas